Ron Potter is an Australian former rugby league footballer in the New South Wales Rugby Football League premiership.

Potter played for the Balmain, Eastern Suburbs and North Sydney clubs as well as being a representative of his state,  New South Wales in the sport. Potter had two seasons with Balmain between 1956–1957. He represented New South Wales on two occasions during 1956. In the 1956 season the second rower was a member of the Balmain side that was beaten by St George in that year's premiership decider. A backrower, Potter had just the one season at Easts in 1959 and is recognised as the Eastern Suburbs club's 491st player. He finished his career at North Sydney for three seasons between 1960–1962.

References

Year of birth missing (living people)
Australian rugby league players
Sydney Roosters players
Balmain Tigers players
North Sydney Bears players
Rugby league second-rows
Place of birth missing (living people)
Possibly living people